Paul Hamilton Wood (16 August 1907 – 13 July 1962) was an Australian cardiologist, defence forces personnel and physician. Wood was born in Coonoor, Tamil Nadu, India and died in London, England.

References

Australian cardiologists
Royal Army Medical Corps officers
Australian Anglicans
Australian people of English descent
1907 births
1962 deaths
People from Coonoor